Clifton Wintringham was the name of two doctors who lived in York:

Clifton Wintringham senior, died 1748
Sir Clifton Wintringham (1720–1794), son of Clifton Wintringham senior